Fahima Awan is a Pakistani actress. She is known for her roles in dramas Alif Allah Aur Insaan, Deewangi, Laapata, Ruswai, Dunk, Fitoor and Siyani.

Early life 
Fahima was born in 1982 on December 19 in Karachi, Pakistan and she completed her studies from University of Karachi.

Career 
Fahima started working as model in 2000 and appeared in music videos and commercials. She was noted for her roles in dramas Tishnagi Dil Ki, Qurban, Baichan DilRu Baru Ishq Tha, Mera Wajood and Kasak. Then she appeared in dramas Haara Dil, Aik Thi Rania, Gul-o-Gulzar, Dunk, Darr Khuda Say and Fitoor. Since then she appeared in dramas Mohabbat Chor Di Maine, Haseena, Kam Zarf, Ruswai, Bechari Qudsia, Laapata and Qismat Ka Likha.

Personal life 
Fahima is married and has two children.

Filmography

Television

Music video

References

External links 
 

1982 births
Pakistani television actresses
Living people
21st-century Pakistani actresses